Salov or SALOV may refer to:

Šalov, a village in Levice District in Slovakia
Salov (surname)
 Società per Azioni Lucchese Olii e Vini (SALOV), the owners of the Filippo Berio brand of olive oil